No. 3 (S.A.) Wing was a South African Air Force commanded formation during World War II that served in North Africa, Sicily and Italy. It was formed on 28 August 1941 and initially consisted of Royal Air Force and South African Air Force squadrons under South African command, known as No. 261 Medium Bomber Wing but became a fully fledged South African formation on 23 September 1942 when No. 55 Squadron RAF and No. 223 Squadron RAF were transferred from 3 (S.A.) Wing to No. 232 Wing RAF and it became known as No. 3 (South Africa) Wing.  This left 12, 21 and 24 Squadrons SAAF as its assigned units.

History
It was designated as a light bomber wing and its squadrons flew Douglas Boston Mk IIIs and Martin Marauder Mk II bombers in North Africa until 1943. The Wing was assigned a company of infantry for ground protection which was initially provided by South African forces and by a Free French company as from end April 1942.

Organisation and Squadrons

Notes

References

Wings of the South African Air Force
Air force units and formations of South Africa
Military units and formations established in 1939
Military units and formations disestablished in 1945